A general order, in military and paramilitary organizations, is a published directive, originated by a commander and binding upon all personnel under his or her command. Its purpose  is to enforce a policy or procedure unique to the unit's situation that is not otherwise addressed in applicable service regulations, military law, or public law.

A general order has the force of law; it is an offense punishable by court martial or lesser military court to disobey one. What makes it a general order (as opposed to a direct order) is that the actor is not explicitly named, nor precisely what (or who) is to be acted upon.

A general order of indefinite duration may be referred to as a standing order. Standing orders are necessarily general and vague since the exact circumstances for execution occur in the future, under unknown conditions. For example, in most military agencies, there is a standing order for enlisted men to salute officers. The officers are required to return the salute to the enlisted person, but the name of each enlisted man, the name of each officer, and the exact time for the salute are not mentioned in the order.

Examples 
 General Order No. 11, December 1862 – Union expulsion of the Jews of Tennessee, Mississippi, and Kentucky
 General Order No. 100, April 1863 – Union instructions on the treatment of prisoners; not giving quarter becomes punishable offense
 General Order No. 11, August 1863 – Union expulsion of residents of four Missouri counties which were to be burned
 General Order No. 9, April 1865 – Confederate General Robert E. Lee's surrender that ended the American Civil War
 General Order No. 3, June 19th, 1865 -- Abolition of slavery in Texas after the American Civil War.
 General Order No. 1, August 1945 – U.S. General Douglas MacArthur's first order following the Japanese surrender in World War II

See also 
 General Orders for Sentries

References

Military law